Edmund George Gresham Sutton (12 October 1844 – 7 October 1903) was an English first-class cricketer active 1864–73 who played for Middlesex and Marylebone Cricket Club (MCC). He was born in Marylebone; died in Tring.

Born:	12 October 1844, Marylebone, Middlesex, England
Died:	7 October 1903, Tring, Hertfordshire, England

References

1844 births
1903 deaths
English cricketers
Middlesex cricketers
Marylebone Cricket Club cricketers
Gentlemen of Marylebone Cricket Club cricketers
Gentlemen of England cricketers